The Town of Iliff is a Statutory Town located in Logan County, Colorado, United States.  The population was 266 at the 2010 United States Census.

History
The town was named for John Wesley Iliff, a cattleman who owned a ranch near the town site.

The people of Iliff have proven to be a resilient folk, surviving a blizzard in 1949 and a flood in 1968. Iliff resides on the fertile banks of the South Platte River. The South Platte has been a cornerstone to the community.

The first building constructed was a Post Office and Real Estate Office in 1870. On Jan. 6, 1885 the city was surveyed and on May 4 of that year, a school district was organized. By 1887 a grocery store and lumber yard were in business. The Iliff Bank was established in 1907. By 1915 there was a Baptist Church and a John Deer Implement Dealership added to the town. The Farmer’s Alfalfa Milling Company started in 1918. There were also two doctors, Daniels and Houff, who owned a drug store. In 1920 the Glory Park Theater opened. In 1923 a town Marshall was hired and an old rail boxcar was used as a jail. In 1928 the Catholic Church was built.

The growth declined during the depression, and again during World War II. In 1957 there were eleven businesses that slowly diminished with more people willing drive 12 miles to Sterling, CO and the opening of Interstate 76, which took all but local travelers off of state highway 138.
 
Iliff is home to the 2002 World Champion Livestock Auctioneer John Korrey.

Geography

Demographics

As of the census of 2000, there were 213 people, 93 households, and 59 families residing in the town. The racial makeup of the town was 90.14% White, 0.47% Asian, 7.04% from other races, and 2.35% from two or more races. Hispanic or Latino of any race were 12.21% of the population.

There were 93 households, out of which 22.6% had children under the age of 18 living with them, 51.6% were married couples living together, 8.6% had a female householder with no husband present, and 35.5% were non-families. 30.1% of all households were made up of individuals, and 15.1% had someone living alone who was 65 years of age or older.  The average household size was 2.29 and the average family size was 2.85.

In the town, the population was spread out, with 23.0% under the age of 18, 9.9% from 18 to 24, 18.8% from 25 to 44, 31.5% from 45 to 64, and 16.9% who were 65 years of age or older.  The median age was 43 years. For every 100 females, there were 106.8 males.  For every 100 females age 18 and over, there were 97.6 males.

The median income for a household in the town was $25,625, and the median income for a family was $29,375. Males had a median income of $30,938 versus $16,000 for females. The per capita income for the town was $15,634.  About 12.3% of families and 14.5% of the population were below the poverty line, including 18.2% of those under the age of eighteen and 10.3% of those 65 or over.

See also

Outline of Colorado
Index of Colorado-related articles
State of Colorado
Colorado cities and towns
Colorado municipalities
Colorado counties
Logan County, Colorado
List of statistical areas in Colorado
Sterling, CO Micropolitan Statistical Area

References

External links
 CDOT map of the Town of Iliff

Towns in Logan County, Colorado
Towns in Colorado